This is a list of many important or pivotal fictional figures in the history of the Warhammer Fantasy universe.

These characters have appeared in the games set in the Warhammer world, the text accompanying various games and games material, novels by GW and later Black Library and other publications based on the Warhammer setting by other publishers.

Some have been produced as modelsm, others have appeared only in text.

High Elves (Asur)

Aenarion the Defender - The first Phoenix King, whose skills were unrivalled amongst other mortals or immortals. He was granted incredible abilities by his gods to combat the first Great Chaos Incursion. Perished alongside his dragon Indraugnir, after slaying four Greater Daemons while defending the creation of the Great Vortex.
Astarielle - First (recorded) Everqueen and first wife of Aenarion. Killed during the Great Catastrophe.
Caledor the Dragontamer - The greatest elven mage ever to have lived and the creator of the Great Vortex. Forged many powerful weapons and artifacts to combat Chaos during the Great Catastrophe.
Alariellem the Radiant - Current Everqueen of Avelorn and spiritual leader of the High Elves.
Alith Anarm - Known as the Shadow King of Nagarythe. Alith Anar is the ruler of the Shadow Warriors.
Eltharionm the Grimdark - A Swordmaster, the Prince of Yvresse and the Warden of Tor Yvresse.
Asarnilm the Dragonlord- An exiled prince and Dog of War, who rides the green dragon Deathfang.
Finubar the Seafarer - the eleventh and current Phoenix King of the High Elves.
Imrikm - Ruling Prince of the kingdom of Caledor, Imrik is a direct descendant of Caledor Dragontamer.
Selafyn of the Annuliim, - Limited edition figure, A Warden of the Annulii and part of the Storm of Chaos event.
Teclism - Most powerful wizard in this age of the world. Founder of the Colleges of Magic in Altdorf. Twin brother of Tyrion.
Tyrionm - Twin brother of Teclis, and direct descendant of Aenarion through his son by Astarielle, Morelion, he is the greatest warrior of the High Elves. He is called the 'Defender of Ulthuan' and is second only to Archaon the Everchosen when it comes to strength at arms.
Caradryanm - Marked by Asuryan and Captain of the Phoenix Guard.

Dark Elves (Druchii)
Malekithm - King of the Dark Elves and second son of Aenarion. Also known as the Witch King.
Malus Darkbladem - A Dark Elf Noble, possessed by the daemon Tz'arkan.
Morathim - The first Hag Queen and sorceress of Naggaroth. Second wife of Aenarion and Mother of Malekith.
Shadowbladem - A highly skilled Dark Elf Assassin, favoured by Hellabron.
Hellebronm - Religious leader of the Dark Elves and greatest among the 'Brides of Khaine'.
Lokhir Fellheartm - an infamous captain of one of the Black Arks.
Kouran Darkhand- captain of the Black Guard, the personal bodyguards of Malekith.
Tullaris Dreadbringer- the captain of the Executioners, the sacred warriors of Khaine.
 Rakarthm - Called the 'Beastmaster'

Wood Elves (Asrai)
Arielm - Queen of Athel Loren. Is one of the most powerful wizards in all Warhammer World. Ariel is a demi-goddess and the avatar of Isha.
Araloth - Lord of Talsyn. Craven in his youth, refusing to hunt that which could hunt him, overcame his fears and slew a daemon to save his goddess.
Drycham - A forest spirit that blames the Asrai for all of Athel Loren's woes.
Durthum - One of the oldest treemen in Athel Loren.
Naestra & Arahanm - The mysterious Sister-twins of Athel Loren, who can command the forest.
Orionm - King of Athel Loren is a demi-god and avatar of Kurnuos. Is the terror of many Bretonnian's towns because of his "Wild Hunt".
Scarloc - An Asrai champion who, with the aid of his men, killed Morghur with "one hundred arrows". He is considered the greatest archer alive.

Note: Both Ariel and Orion appear to be drawn from the fairy monarchs Oberon and Titania of William Shakespeare's A Midsummer Night's Dream.

Chaos
Aekold Helbrassm,  - Once a knight of the Templar Order of the Jade Griffon, he pledged his eternal loyalty to Tzeentch.
An'ggrath the Unbound - The most powerful Bloodthirster of Khorne, replaced Skarbrand as the Blood God's most favored minion. Noted for having a forked whip.
Arbaal the Undefeatedm - Chosen champion of Khorne, he rides upon Khorne's personal hound and wields the Destroyer of Khorne, a powerful axe.
Archaonm, - The Everchosen, Lord of the End Times. Archaon led the latest invasion of the Empire in the worldwide campaign Storm of Chaos. He dueled Valten, champion of Sigmar and Luthor Huss, in battle during the Battle of Middenheim - but was then defeated by the Black Orc warlord Grimgor Ironhide and forced to quit the battlefield. These events were later retconed in the end times story to have never occurred. Archeon proceeded to lead chaos to victory leading to the end of the world and was last scene tumbling into the abyss with Sigmar. Later on he emerged alive in age of sigmar.
Azazel, Prince of Damnation m - Gerreon is the twin brother to one of Sigmar's dearest friends. Upon this twin's death in battle, Gerreon grew to hate Sigmar, eventually betraying Sigmar, nearly killing him; Sigmar's first love Ravenna, who was also Gerreon's older sister, died by Gerreon's blade. Later ascended to Daemonhood, known as Azazel.
Be'lakorm - The Harbinger, He Who Heralds the Conquerors, The shadow master of Mordheim. The first Daemon Prince of Chaos, cursed by the god Tzeentch to crown the Everchosen.
Crom the Conquerorm - A powerful warlord, Vardek Crom is allied with Archaon. During the Storm of Chaos, Crom led his army to attack the Empire from the east while Archaon attacked from the north. Vardek Crom also defeated WAAAGH! Grimgor in the beginning of the campaign. He is believed to have been slain by the undead forces of Mannfred von Carstein whilst trying to lead his army through Sylvania to attack the Empire from the south.
Dechala the Denied Onem- Once a beautiful High Elf princess, Dechala's family gave her to a Daemon Prince of Slaanesh during Aenarion's time as a sacrifice to save themselves. Driven mad by betrayed hate, Dechala sold her soul to Slaanesh for the chance to exact revenge on her family. Slaanesh accepted, and with his aid, Dechala exacted a terrible and bloody vengeance on her kinsmen. Now she is a monstrous daemonic creature, with a beautiful humanoid upper body and the repulsive lower body of a gigantic snake.
Egrimm von Horstmannm, - Von Horstmann was a wizard of the Light College who had pledged his soul to the Chaos god Tzeentch in return for increased magical power. He rose quickly through the ranks, and corrupted many of his brethren before being found out by the Light wizard Vespasian Kant. Facing the wrath of both the College of Light and the Church of Sigmar, he fled to the Chaos Wastes on the back of the twin-headed Chaos Dragon Baudros. He dwells there still, leading The Cabal, the most powerful cult of Tzeentch in the World.
Feytor the Taintedm - One of Archaon's four lieutenants. A Chaos Lord devoted to the Plague Lord Nurgle.
Festus the Leechlordm- Once the best doctor in the Imperial province of Nordland, Festus fell from grace after he sold his soul to Nurgle in exchange for knowing the cure to a disease he couldn't stop. He was left a deranged maniac, seeking only to experiment with the effect of disease on humanity.
Galrauchm, - First of the Chaos Dragons, and Father of all that monstrous breeds. Originally a mighty and noble Star Dragon who aided the High Elves in their war against Chaos, he mutated into a Chaos dragon after he slew a greater daemon of Tzeentch, which possessed him afterwards. His noble spirit still battles for control of his body and from time to time resurfaces: it is rumoured one day Galrauch will overcome the evil within him.
Gorthor m - A Beastlord that is unafraid of killing Shamans. He has a cloak made out of the flayed hides of shamans he has slain. With his vision and skills of persuasion, Gorthor raised an immense warherd and laid waste to two whole Imperial provinces before he was finally killed.
Ghorros Warhoof m- A powerful Centigor who has fought in thousands of battles and sired countless offspring, Ghorros is treated with respect and familial loyalty by all Beastmen. On his brow, he wears the skull of Arsil the Prince of Unicorns, a Wood Elf lord whom Ghorros murdered many years ago.
Haargroth the Blooded One - Haargroth was a peasant boy who proved his mettle in combat, and became a Chaos Lord devoted to the Blood God Khorne and one of Archaon's four lieutenants. He was slain by Ar-Ulric Valgeir during the Battle of Middenheim.
Harald Hammerstormm - "Harry the Hammer" is a legendary chaos warrior, roaming the Chaos Wastelands searching for more of the undead to slay. He has an eternal grudge against any of the undead. This character was on the cover of Warhammer 1st Edition.
Khazrak the One-Eye m - Said to be the most dangerous of all the beastlords in the Drakwald Forest.
Kholek Suneater-One of the oldest, largest and most powerful Dragon Ogre Shaggoths in existence.
Malagor the Dark Omenm Bourne aloft on feathered pinions, Malagor is viewed by mankind as an embodiment of the destruction of all civilisation, while to the Beastmen, he is the embodiment of Mankind's destruction. His mere presence inspires awe in his followers, and utter terror in his enemies.
Morghur, Master of Skulls m - Spreads Chaos wherever he goes. His presence can cause those nearby to mutate horrendeously.
Sigvald m - An incest spawned bastard, Sigvald murdered his father for trying to exile him after his excesses became too much to put up with. Sigvald, however, soon found a patron who not only approved of his cruel and debauched excesses, but openly rewarded him for them: Slaanesh.
Skarbrand the Exiled Onem - Khorne's former favorite Bloodthirster, tricked by Tzeentch into attacking the Blood God in blind rage. After doing so the daemon was permanently banished from Khorne's forces and realm, forcing him into a mindless frenzy unable to distinguish friend from foe. Noted for being unable to fly and using two axes instead of the standard ax and whip arsenal of a typical Bloodthirster.
Throggm- Also known as the 'Troll King', Throgg is an oddity in that he is much smarter than his trollish kin. With his superior intellect and great strength, he has made it his mission to overthrow the race of Men, and bring about a nightmare age of ice and darkness where he and his monstrous brethren will rule the world.
U'Zuhl the Skulltakerm - Is the Blood God's immortal champion, the strongest of all Khorne's Bloodletters. Appearing before enemy armies he bellows a challenge at the greatest warriors present until one of them is foolish enough to answer. When a foe emerges, Skulltaker charges forward to claim another skull in the name of the Blood God.
Valkia the Bloodym- When Queen Valkia was slain in battle, Khorne resurrected her into a form more pleasing to him. Now a twisted mix of beautiful woman and monstrous demon, Valkia fights now only to serve her diabolic paramour: Khorne himself.
Vilitch the Curselingm- The smaller and weaker of two twins, Vilitich was mercilessly beaten and abused by his elder brother, Thomin. After begging Tzeentch to reverse their fates, he awoke to find he and his brother had been fused together. Better still, he had become a sorcerer of phenomenal power, while his brother was now but a shambling automaton. Now Vilitch is master of his tribe, using his brother's strength to kill those his sorcery can't destroy - a rare occurrence indeed.
Wulfrik the Wandererm- After arrogantly boasting that he was the equal of any warrior in this world or the next, the Chaos Gods cursed Wulfrik to spend eternity wandering the world, proving his arrogant claim.
Ku'gath plaguefather Ku'gath is the chosen greather demon of Nurgle. He brings plague wherever he goes and is the living embodiment of nurgle.
Kairos fateweaverKairos is a twin headed lord of change. His right head see the future while his left sees the past. He knows about every spell in the old world and can read the past and future possibly better than tzeench himself.
N'karim- N'kari is slanesh's champion and is always on the hunt for the greatest pleasure ever know. He also has a deep hatred for the twins of Ulthan Tyrion and Teclis

Orcs and Goblins (Greenskins)
'Azhag the Slaughtererm - Orc warlord, victor of the Battle for Butcher's Hill, he retrieved the Crown of Sorcery (created by Nagash) from a Chaos Troll's hoard.
Borgut Facebeaterm - Orc warrior of the Red Eye Mountain whose fighting spirit impressed Grimgor enough to now serve directly under the warboss instead of killing him as a potential rival.
Gorbad Ironclawm - Orc Warboss, leader of the Ironskin Tribe. He destroyed the Imperial province of Solland, taking its Elector Count's Runefang and besieged the Imperial capital, Altdorf. He is proclaimed as the greatest orc that ever lived.
Gorfang Rotgutm - Chieftain of the Orcs of Black Crag, the ancient Dwarf hold taken over by Orcs many years ago.
Grimgor Ironhidem - Black Orc Warboss, Defeated Archaon the everchosen during storm of chaos.
Grom the Paunchm - Goblin Leader, sacked the Empire and invaded Ulthuan.
Morglum Necksnapperm - Black Orc Warlord.
Skarsnik & Gobblam - Night Goblin warlord, self-proclaimed Warlord of Karak Eight Peaks, a Dwarf hold now inhabited by dwarves, skaven and goblins who fight with each other constantly for supremacy. Gobbla is his pet squig.

Dwarfs (Dawi)
Alaric the Mad - Runesmith, perhaps the greatest to ever live, he eventually went insane after crafting the Nemesis Crown. He created the 12 Runefangs given to the Elector Counts of the Empire. Sigmar was aided several times throughout his life by a dwarf named Alaric after he rescued the Dwarven King Kurgan Ironbeard, it was Kurgan who gave him Ghal-maraz(Skull-Splitter.) Due to his habit of aiding humans, other Dwarves dubbed him 'Alaric the Mad'.
Alrik Ranulfssonm - King of Karak Hirn, even his fellow dwarfs consider him extremely dedicated to the customs and traditions of his ancestors. He rides upon his great-great-great-grandfather's shield into battle, carried by two dwarfs.
Garagrim Ironfistm - The son of Ungrim Ironfist, Garagrim had devised a plan to rid his family line of its dishonour. By dying in combat as his father's champion, Garagrim believed he would prove the worthiness of the bloodline. He was killed when a chaos giant fell on him as it died, thus fulfilling his slayer vow.
Gotrek Gurnissonm - Slayer whose exploits are chronicled in the Gotrek and Felix series of books. His companion is the human Felix Jaegerm.
Grimnir - Ancient dwarf god, who legend says carried two huge axes and wandered into the chaos wastes to do battle. He was never seen again. One of his axes now belongs to the dwarf high king Thorgrim Grudgebearer, the other reputedly belongs to Gotrek Gurnisson.
Grombrindal, the White Dwarfm - A white-bearded dwarf hero, suspected to be Snorri Whitebeard, the first High King of the Dwarfs. Taken from the emblem of White Dwarf magazine.
Josef Bugmanm - The greatest dwarf master brewer of all time, his brewery was destroyed by a band of marauding Goblins and he now wanders the world with his band of rangers hunting and killing Goblins wherever they find them.
King Kazador - Dwarf King of Karak Azul, the last of the once wealthy southern holds to remain in Dwarf hands.
Malakai Makaissonm - Slayer Engineer. Possibly one of the most brilliant engineers alive, but also quite mad. He claims he will prove his theories or die trying. He took the slayers crest when his first experimental airship, the Indestructible, killed a score of dwarfs. During the Second Siege of Praag Malakai used his second airship, the Spirit of Grungni, to fight Chaos in two ways. First, he delivered at least 200 Slayers to help the besieged city. Second, the airship was heavily loaded with highly flammable liquids and bombs, which Malakai then dropped upon the Chaos forces massed around the city.
Snorri Nosebiterm - Slayer who is friend to Gotrek Gurnisson and aids him occasionally. Noteworthy that for his baldness making it impossible for him to have the typical Slayer mohawk, so he instead uses orange painted nails driven into his skull.
Thorek Ironbrowm - The master runelord of Karak Azul who seeks to restore lost dwarf relics. He fights his foes with his anvil of doom.
Thorgrim Grudgebearerm - Dwarf High King and King of Karaz-A-Karak as well as Keeper of the Great Book of Grudges.
Ungrim Ironfistm - Dwarf "Slayer King" and ruler of Karak Kadrin also known as the Slayer Keep.

Bretonnia
Alberic d'Bordeleaux - Alberic is the current Duke of Bordeleaux and is noted for keeping a small but well trained force as opposed to his neighboring lands. 
Armand d'Aquitainem - Armand is the Duke of Aquitaine. He only took the post after his brother died and Louen ordered him to fulfill his familial duty, as Armand preferred seeking glory as a Knight Errent.
Bohemond Beastslayerm - Bohemond is the Duke of Bastonne, and although blood decedent of Gilles le Breton, he is fiercely loyal to Louen Leoncoeur. 
Chilfroy d'Artois - Chilfroy is the Duke of Artois, and is noted for his size and grim nature. 
Fay Enchantressm - The highest mage of the Bretonnian realm.  Her fury is legendary.  Rides a Unicorn. Although the Fay Enchantress is a Character that can be taken as part of the (Human) Bretonnian army, she is in fact a Wood Elf.
The Green Knightm - A Spectre, whether he is the spirit of Bretonnia given form, or Gilles le Breton is debated.
Louen Leoncoeurm - Current King of Bretonnia.
Repanse de Lyonessem - Repanse was a Bretonnian Paladin before rising to the rank of Duchess of Lyonesse. She earned her rank due to her assault against a chaos invasion in the land.
Roland le Marechalm - Roland is the captain in charge of defending Couronne's eastern frontier , a swamp-filled land between Bretonnia and Marienburg.

Dogs of War
Borgio the Besiegerm - Mercenary-prince of Miragliano in Tilea.  Famed for being notoriously hard to kill, until his assassination with a poisoned toasting fork.
Detlef Sierck - The greatest living playwright, slayer of Constant Drachenfels, and lover of Genevieve Dieudonne.
Lietpold the Black - A mercenary captain and self-made ruler in the Boarder Princes lands.
Lorenzo Lupom - Mercenary-prince of the city of Lucinni in Tilea.  Possibly modeled on the Roman Hercules, for his incredible physique and training programmes.
Lucrezzia Belladonnam - Lucresszzia is a Tilean noble known for her beauty and ability to keep control over the province of Pavona. The secret to her success is thought to be the careful "accidents" all surrounding poison.
Marco Colombom - Great swimmer, not a fish out of water.

Empire
Aldebrand Ludenhofm - Aldebrand is the Elector Count of Hochland. 
Balthasar Geltm - Supreme Patriarch of the Colleges of Magic and Patriarch of the Gold Order.
Boris Todbringerm - Elector Count of Middenland.
Brunner - a ruthless, feared human bounty hunter known for not only his great skill in combat and tracking his quarry, but also for the variety of exotic and deadly weapons he wields (pistols, a magical sword, a stake capable of slaying a Tomb King, and a Skaven repeating crossbow amongst other, more powerful items). He is a character created by C.L. Werner's novels set in Warhammer Fantasy.
Constant Drachenfels - The "Great Enchanter". One of the most powerful wizards who ever lived.
Detlef Sierck - The greatest living playwright, slayer of Constant Drachenfels, and lover of Genevieve Dieudonne.
Karl Franzm - Current Emperor of the Empire.
Kurt Helborgm - Captain of the Reiksguard Knights, Reiksmarshall of the Imperial armed forces. 
Ludwig Schwarzhelmm - The Emperor's Champion and Imperial Standard Bearer.
Luthor Hussm - Prophet of Sigmar.  Took Valten under his wing and convinced the Emperor of Valten's divine blood. Spends his time preaching against the corruption in the upper ranks of the Sigmarites (never attacks the leader of the Sigmarites Volkmar Von Grimm).
Magnus the Pious - the Emperor that re-unified the Empire and allowed the creation of the Colleges of Magic.
Mathias Thulmann - a ruthless witch hunter that hunts down and slays all those thought to be in league with chaos or the undead - chronicled in the Witch Hunter books from Black Library
Markus Wulfhart - the Huntsmarshal of the Empire, is a legendary scout. After slaying the Drakwald Cyclops, he was given a magical bow from the Imperial vaults and was then tasked by Karl Franz with recruiting a band of like-minded elite scouts.
Marius Leitdorfm - Marius is the Elector Count of Averland, but is best known as the Mad Count of Averland. Known to have waged war against forests, bees, and imagined foes. He is, however, noted for his martial skill and bravery in battle. Karl Franz considers him a fast ally.
Morgan Bernhardt - a Mercenary commander who once defeated gigantic hordes of Undead.
Sigmar Heldenhammer - Deified founder of the Empire. Nowadays worshipped as a god.
Thyrus Gormannm - Patriarch of the Bright College of Magic.  Former Supreme Patriarch.
Valtenm - The avatar of Sigmar. He was critically wounded by Archaon and went missing. The sickbed on which he had been resting was covered in blood, a Skaven symbol had been carved in the wall, and a "dark, glowing, serrated blade" had been stabbed into the bed.
Valmir von Raukovm - Elector Count of Ostland.
Volkmar 'the Grim' von Hindensternm - Grand Theologian of Sigmar. Holds a vote in the Imperial Electors

Kislev
Tzarina Katarinm - Current Queen of Kislev, titled the Ice Queen.
Tzar Borism - Former Tzar of Kislev, father of Katarin.

Undead

Abhorash - The father of the Blood Dragon bloodline of vampires and the only master vampire to unwillingly take the elixir of eternal life. Abhorash scaled on top of a great mountain and a red dragon of immense size emerged from the crater and descended upon the Vampire Lord. The two fought the entire night and in the end the Vampire was victorious. As the dragon lashed in its death throes, Abhorash seized its throat with his fangs and drank deep. Intoxicated by the blood of the dragon Abhorash cast the carcass of the broken creature down from the mountain top. Because of the dragon's blood, he no longer needs the blood of human men.
Arkhan the Blackm - Former lieutenant of Nagash when living, raised as undead and continued to serve.
Constant Drachenfels the Great Enchanter alongside Nagash and Teclis possibly the most powerful magic-user of the Warhammer World, despite having been slain more than once he keeps resuscitating himself, his keep, the ominous "Schloss Drachenfels" (or Castle Drachenfels in English) also keeps "growing back" after each successive destruction, thanks to the magic Constant himself imbued in the very earth and stones of the place.
Dieter Hellsnichtm, Doomlord of Middenheim - A necromancer and leader of an undead army around 1270 IC.
Dread King - A giant necromancer that leads various types of undead and carries a large sword.
Genevieve Dieudonné - A vampire who appears in a number of novels by Jack Yeovil. Unusual as an undead character as she can most often be found trying to preserve the realms of humans against evil, rather than destroy them.
Hand of Ualapt - Servant of the Tomb King's vulture-headed god of scavengers and guardian in the Temple of the Vulture Lord located in the Land of the Dead in Warhammer Online.
Heinrich Kemmler the Lichemasterm - A mighty necromancer. It is currently rumored that he is a puppet of Nagash.
High Priest Herakh - High Priest of the Temple of the Vulture Lord located in the Land of the Dead in Warhammer Online.
Khalida Neferherm, - High Queen of Tomb Kings.
Krell, Lord of Undeathm - was a mighty Chaos Champion in the days before the birth of Sigmar, the ruler of a barbarian tribe that had been corrupted by the Chaos God Khorne. Though eventually slain by the Dwarf hero Grimbul Ironhelm during his assault on Karak Kadrin, Krell was returned to the mortal realm almost 1500 years later at the mercy of the great Necromancer, Nagash. Krell was finally defeated by Sigmar many years later and the resurrected by Heinrich Kemmler, the Lichemaster. Armed with the Black Axe - a terrifying weapon of immense proportions, Krell will cut a bloody swathe through all in his path.
Lady Melissa d'Arques - A vampire who is over 1100 years old and is one of the oldest vampires in existence, she is also a member of the Vampire Council under Elder Honorio and is the Grandmother in Darkness of Genevieve Dieudonné who is her Grand Get.
Melkhiorm - A powerful Necrarch vampire, student and slayer of W'Soran and former mentor of Zacharias the Everliving.  Believed to have been destroyed by Zacharias.
Luthor Harkon - a vampire of the Blood Dragon bloodline who was shipwrecked on the coast of Lustria and founded an undead realm using lost sailors in the area now known as the Vampire Coast.
Nagashm,  - First and greatest of necromancers, and one of the three greatest magic users in the entire world. Nagash created the entire scourge of undeath and introduced it to the world, and is likely the most powerful "undead" present.
Neferatam - Mother of the Lahmia bloodline of vampires and previous queen of all the seven original vampire masters. She currently resides in the Silver Pinnacle.
The Red Duke - The Red Duke is the former Duke of Aquitaine, who was betrayed and left for dead. Abhorash observed the man and offered to save him with his own blood dragon blood. From this blood, a new vampire was born, slaying his betrayers and friends alike. He was eventually defeated, but resurrected again, taking residence in Mousillion. 
Settram - The First and Eternal king of all Tomb Kings. he founded the liche priest cult and was the first king to be preserved. Hates all vampires.
Ushoran - Father of the Strigoi bloodline of vampires. He is believed to be killed in the Orc invasion of the capital of his kingdom of Strigos.  He in fact survived and lived on in the empire as the secret patron in of the strigony.  He was asked by one of the strigony to exact vengeance on the men who slaughtered his caravan.  He agreed to do it.  After killing the soldiers. He went on to kill the noble  who commanded them to kill the strigony.  He continued on to kill the count of averland.
Usirian's Keeper - Bone giant servant of Usirian, the faceless Tomb King god of the underworld, in the Temple of the Vulture Lord located in the Land of the Dead in Warhammer Online.
the Von Carstein vampires
Vladm - A powerful vampire count, killed at the Siege of Altdorf by the Grand Theogonist and the treachery of Mannfred. The father of the von Carstein bloodline of vampires. Relative of Nagash and originally a noble of Nehekhara. Holds the von Carstein ring allowing him to be continuously resurrected. 
Isabellam - The wife of Vlad von Carstein, who committed suicide at the Siege of Altdorf once she heard her beloved Vlad was killed. She did this as she did not wish to carry on her unlife without him.
Mannfredm - A descendant of Vlad and a powerful magician defeated but not necessarily killed at the "Battle of Hel Fenn".
Konradm - Another descendant of Vlad and utterly, irredeemably insane.  Presumed dead.
Walach - the favourite of Abhorash's minions, he ruled Blood Keep and was Grand Master of the Blood Knights until Blood Keep was razed by the templars and witch hunters of the Empire during a lengthy siege.
W'soran - The father of the Necrarch bloodline of vampires and the only master vampire to stay loyal to Nagash.
Melchiorm - A powerful Necrarch vampire, Zacharaias' teacher.  Rumoured to be W'soran.
Zacharias the Everlivingm, - A powerful Necrarch vampire.
Count NoctilusHe is the leader of the blessed dread and a powerful warlord
Cylostra DirefinShe is the maiden of the drowned deep and a powerful socceres
Aranessa Saltspite is the pirate queen of  Sartosa, an island located in the south of Tilea, 
renowned for being one of the largest hideouts of pirates in the Old World.

SkavenDeathmaster Snikchm,  - Deathmaster Snikch is the chief assassin and prime agent of Lord Sneek, Lord of Decay and Nightlord of clan Eshin. Possible murderer of Valten.Grey Seer Thanquolm,  - Thanquol is one of the most powerful and active of the Grey Seers. He is always accompanied by Boneripper, his mechanized undead Rat Ogre. Though he is supremely cunning and a masterful schemer, his plans are nearly always thwarted by Gotrek and Felix (the defeats are often compounded by Skaven cowardice and incompetence), and he hates and fears them in equal measure.Ikit Clawm - Ikit Claw has dedicated his long life to the study of all forms of magery, including the spells of Men and Elves. His loyalty is to clan Skryre.Lurk Snitchtongue - Grey Seer Thanquol's servant who secretly tries to double cross his master numerous times in the Gotrek and Felix series of novels. He later becomes mutated by sneaking aboard Malakai Makaisson's airship The Spirit of Grungi which ventured into the Chaos Wastes. Lurk eventually believes he is the chosen of the Horned Rat and leads a skaven rebellion.Plague Lord Nurglitchm - The first plague lord of clan Pestilens and member of the Council of Thirteen. It was his corrupting disease that now marks clan Pestilens members as different from the other clans.Lord Skrolkm - Skrolk was a simple Plague Monk at the beginning of his life, but his devotion to the Horned Rat aided him in the long struggle for power, eventually leading him to Skavenblight to offer his services to Nurglitch, the seventh Arch-Plaguelord.Skweel Gnawtoothm - Skweel is clan Moulder's greatest packmaster. Born a runt, his continual fight for survival eventually led to great skill in commanding the larger, more unstable rats like Rat Ogres.Thrott the Uncleanm - Master mutator of Clan Moulder.  Possesses a warpstone eye and three arms, which prove an advantage in combat, as he can wield both a mancatcher and sword at onceTretch Craventailm - Tretch is the Clanchief of the Skaven clan Rictus and is known for his cunning and ability to survive any situation. He took his title as Clanchief by disguising himself as a stalactite and falling upon the previous Clanchief, splitting him in two.VerminLord Skreech verminking Lord skreech verminking is the avatar of the horned rat. He was part of the original council of thirteen and when they displeased the horned rat and were imprisoned skreech ate them and turned into the most powerful skaven of all time Warlord Queek headtakerm - Warlord Queek the Head-taker is the right claw of Warlord Gnawdwell, the ruler of Clan Mors and the City of Pillars. Gnawdwell is one of the Lords of Decay and without doubt one of the most powerful warlords in the Under-Empire.

OgreGreasus Goldtoothm - Tradelord Greasus Tribestealer Drakecrush Hoardmaster Goldtooth the Shockingly Obese.  Overtyrant of the Goldtooth tribe and the area surrounding his kingdom.  The most successful tyrant yet in the Mountains of MournSkrag the Slaughtererm - a downcast Ogre Butcher and Prophet of the Great MawJhared the Red - the first true Ogre Hunter.  Covered in thick red hair all over his bodyGolgfag Maneaterm - Mercenary captain and the first Ogre to coin the phrase ManeaterBragg the Gutsmanm -  is the champion executioner of Ogrekind, a slayer of kings and heroes. To see him on the field of battle is to see death itself at work. Armed with the fearsome Great Gutgouger, a massive poleaxe, Bragg has an affinity for striking just the right point on his foe to cause maximum damage.Ghark Ironskin - Chieftain of the Ironskin Tribe and the first Ogre to claim a Rhinox as a personal mount. Allied with the Chaos Dwarves, who have built a mechanical mount to replace his slain Rhinox.

LizardmenLord Mazdamundi - The most senior living Slann in the world. Speculated to have caused great damage to the early Dwarf empire in the distant past with his geomantic magics.Venerable Lord Kroakm, - Greatest of the first generation of the Slann, though his powers are a shadow of what they once were due to his death in ancient times where Khorne sent his 12 Greatest Bloodthristers with his most powerful anti-magic runes burned into their flesh smote him. Exists today only as a mummified relic within which his formidable spirit still lingers.Kroq-garm, - One of the greatest Saurus warriors and perhaps the greatest warrior in the world, he was spawned in Xhotl and hunts down chaos warriors as an outrider.  He is worshipped in Albion as a wrathful God.  Kroq-Gar has slain the chaos riding demon prince Vashnaar the Tormentor as well other great foes.Grymloqm - Is Kroq-Gars Carnosaur steed.  Found as part of a brood feasting on a slain Thunder Lizard he was the most ferocious.  He is his masters thirteenth steed to date and the most powerful, having slain chaos dragons as well as other warped beasts brought by the enemies of the Old Ones.Nakai - A Kroxigor from the first spawning, known to have killed legions of Chaos worshipers and Daemons as well as Dwarfs in the battles of Itza and Albion. Held the Bridge of Stars during the Great Fall against a horde of demons by himself.  Thought dead he has reappeared many times during the Lizardmen's greatest hour of need, his scales are exceptionally tough even for other ancient Kroxigors.Tehenauinm - leads the faithful of Sotek in a ceaseless war against the vile Skaven of Clan Pestilens.Adohi-Tehga Lord of Tlaxtlan - A second generation Slann and second only in power to Mazdamundi.Chakaxm the eternity warden: The prime guardian of Xlanhuapec. As the eternity warden, he guards the Slanns' Chamber of Eternity against outside intrusion.  Considered to the greatest bodyguard of all time, no one has ever fallen beneath his protection.  Hundreds of skaven and dark elf assassins have been smashed by his great mace.Oxyotlm - An ancient Chameleon Skink whose temple city was sucked into the Realms of Chaos.  Alone he sneaked and killed across the wastes for centuries before crossing Naggorth and finally coming back home to Lustria where thousands of years had passed in his wake.  No Slann dare read his mind in case of being tainted.Tetto'Ekom - A venerable old Skink priest who is a loremaster of Celestial spells. He was given a palanquin like a slann's, in order to carry his frail body and other arcane artifacts.Tiktaq'Tom - A skink chieftain who rides a terradon. Helped to fight off the Chaos Horde and had command of the city of Hexoatl while Lord Mazdamundi was away.Ten Zlati - A skink terradon rider who is known as the Oracle of Kroak, due to the fact that Lord Kroak often uses this skink's body to vassal from.
 Gor-Rok  - An ancient white Saurus known as the "Great White Lizard". He is the champion of Itza.

Deities

Elves

Asuryan
Vaul
Kurnous
Morai-Heg
Isha
Kaela Mensha Khaine
Lileath
Loec
Hoeth

Greenskins
Gork and Mork
The Great Spider (Forest Goblins Only)

Dwarfs

Grimnir*
Grungni
Valaya
Rukh
Morngrim
Mordred
Hrungnor
Alfginnar
Azram the Mighty

Ogre
The Great Maw

Human

Sigmar
Ulric
Morr
Taal

Chaos
Khorne
Slaanesh
Tzeentch
Nurgle
Malal
The Horned Rat
Hashut
Zuvassin
Necoho

LawSolkanAlluminasAriankaLizardmen/Slann/AmazonChotec, the Solar GodSotek, the Serpent GodQuetzl, the Protector GodHuanchi, the Jaguar GodTzunki, the Water GodTlazcotl, the ImpassiveTepok''', the Inscrutable

Creatures

Humanoids

Dwarf.
Halfling
Human.
Humans have many distinct cultures, including the men of The Empire, Bretonnia,  Kislev, Norsca, Albion, Middenheim, Tilea, Estalia as well as more far of places such as Ind, Arabay, Nippon and Cathay. Oh and Of course Amazons. 
Elf: High Elves (7th)"/>
As with Humans Elves have several different cultures, the main ones are the High Elf, Dark Elf and Wood Elf, although the High Elves have further subdivisions such as the Shadow Elves of Nagarythe and the Elves of Caledor who are culturally distinct.
Ogre
Giant

Greenskins
Orc
Savage Orc
Black Orc
Goblin
Common Goblin
Night Goblin
Forest Goblin
Troglagob (Aquatic Goblin)
Boggart (Marsh Goblin)
Fire Kobold
Dust Goblin (Undead Goblin)
Greater Goblin (Also known as a Hill Goblin)
Lesser Goblin (Also known as a Hill Goblin - these are also known as Gnoblars)
Snotling
Gnoblar
Boglar (Aquatic Gnoblar)
Hobgoblin
Iron orc
Squig

Undead
Skeleton
Wraith - failed attempt of necromancer to become Lich, grim-reaper-like appearance
Banshee
Spectre
Zombie
Ghoul - former bestial humans who turned cannibalised
Wight - "Skeleton" with mind, but not free-will
Mummy
Vampire
Vhargulf - devolved feral Beast-like vampire
Carrion - giant undead birds
Tomb Scorpion
Bone Giant
Liche - powerful undead being with free-will, see Nagash
Strigoi
Zombie Dragon

Beasts
Dragon
Green Dragon
Forest Dragon
Blue Dragon
Sea Dragon
White Dragon
Black Dragon
Red Dragon
Wyvern - dragon like creature with wings but only two limbs
Hydra
Kharibdyss
Chimera
Griffin
Hippogriff
Taurus
Lammasu
Manticore
Giant Scorpion
Great Eagle
Tuskgor
Razorgor
Mastiff
Mournfang
Rhinox
Sabretusk
Yhetee
Cockatrice
Stonehorn
Thundertusk
Cerberus
Mammoth
Elephant

Daemons
Chaos Undivided
Chaos Spawn
Wyrd Spawn
Daemon Prince
Chaos Fury
Hellcannon - part machine, part-daemon
of Khorne
Bloodletter
Bloodthirster
Fleshhound
Juggernaught
of Nurgle
Great Unclean One
Nurgling
Plaguebearer
Beast of Nurgle
of Slaanesh
Daemonettes
Fiends
Keeper of Secrets
Steeds of Slaanesh
of Tzeentch
Lord of Change
Flamer
Pink/Blue Horror
Screamer
Disk of Tzeentch

Elementals
Earth Elemental
Death Elemental/Mardagg
Life Elemental/Viydagg
Water Elemental/Sea Elemental
Fire Elemental
Air Elemental
Mud Elemental
Wisentlich (WHFRP)
Spirit Elemental

Beast-humanoids

Skaven - rat like humanoids
Beastmen
Minotaur - bull humanoids
Dragon-Ogres
Dragon-Ogre Shaggoths
Bull-Centaurs - half chaos dwarf/half bull
Rat-Ogre - giant bipedla rat creatures
Centigor - centauroids with the upper body of a beastman atop a horse-like body
Harpy
Werewolf
Centaur - half man/ half horse
Ghorgon - four-armed bull giants
Cygor - cyclopsian bull humanoids
Ganeshan - four-armed giant elephant humanoids

Lizard
Zoat
Troglodyte
Saurus
Skink
Slann
Stegadon
Arcanadon
Cold One
Carnivorous Snapper/Cold One Warhound
Carnosaur
Beeka
Salamander
Winged Serpent
Kroxigor
Crocodile

Sea monsters
from Man O' War
Triton - possibly a demi-god
Sea Elemental
Gargantuan - giant snake like creature
Promethean - a giant crab
Helldrake - created by dark Elves from dragons
Kraken - a giant squid
Megalodon - a giant shark
Black Leviathan - a giant toothed fish
Sea Dragon
Behemoth
Archelon

Other
Ushabti - Anubis-lookalike statues used as guards by Tomb Kings
Troll
Stone Troll
River Troll
Chaos Troll
Cave Troll (From Advanced Hero Quest)
Snow Troll (From the old Citadel Journal Norse Army List, and the LRB Blood Bowl Norse Team)
Forest Troll (From the 7th Ed Orc and Goblin Army book Playtests, however the rules never made it canon)
Lava Troll (White Dwarf April 2005.  Can be used as a Dogs of War unit.)
Fimir
Treeman
Dryad
Treekin
Gorger

See also
 Games Workshop

References

Warhammer Fantasy
Warhammer Fantasy